This is a partial list of molecules that contain 9 carbon atoms.

See also
 Carbon number
 List of compounds with carbon number 8
 List of compounds with carbon number 10

C09